Angela Musiimenta is a Ugandan scientist. She won the first German-African Innovation Incentive Award.

Education 
Musiimenta acquired a Bachelor of Science degree from Mbarara University of Science and Technology. She later pursued a master of science degree in Information Systems at the University of Leeds. Musiimenta currently holds a PhD in health informatics from the University of Manchester.

References 

Year of birth missing (living people)
Living people
Ugandan women scientists